Hasenhatz zur Rokokozeit, or Hasenhatz der Rokokozeit, is an outdoor sculpture by Max Baumbach, installed at Fasanerieallee in the Tiergarten, Berlin, Germany.

References

External links

 

Animals in art
Outdoor sculptures in Berlin
Sculptures of men in Germany
Statues in Germany
Tiergarten (park)